Opogona percnodes is a moth of the family Tineidae. It is found in India and Sri Lanka.

The wingspan is 12–15 mm. The forewings are dark fuscous, with purplish-bronzy reflections. The hindwings are dark fuscous, faintly purplish-tinged.

References

Moths described in 1910
Opogona